League tables for the 2005 Kyrgyzstan League Second Level season.

Northern Zone

Southern Zone
Al Fagir started season in the Kyrgyzstan League but withdrew and subsequently entered Kyrgyzstan League Second Level, changing their name to Dinamo Aravan.

Kyrgyzstan League Second Level seasons
2
Kyrgyzstan League
2004–05 in Asian second tier association football leagues